Mondini is an Italian surname. Notable people with the surname include:

Gianpaolo Mondini (born 1972), Italian cyclist
Giorgio Mondini (born 1980), Swiss racing driver
Luca Mondini (born 1970), Italian footballer
Stefano Mondini (born 1987), Italian footballer

See also
Franco Mondini-Ruiz (born 1961), American artist
Mondini dysplasia, inner ear abnormality
Mondino

Italian-language surnames